This is a list of episodes of Fake Reaction, a British comedy panel game show on ITV2. The show is presented by Matt Edmondson with team captains Joe Swash and Ellie Taylor.

Episode list
The coloured backgrounds denote the result of each of the shows:
 – indicates Joe's team won 
 – indicates Ellie's team won
 – indicates the game ended in a draw

Series 1

Series 2

References

External links

Lists of British comedy television series episodes
Lists of British non-fiction television series episodes